The men's track time trial at the 1972 Summer Olympics in Munich, West Germany, was held on 31 August 1972. There were 31 participants from 31 nations, with each nation limited to one cyclist. One additional cyclist was entered but did not start. The event was won by Niels Fredborg of Denmark, the nation's first victory in the men's track time trial since Willy Hansen won in 1928. Denmark tied Italy and Australia for second-most gold medals in the event at 2 (behind Italy at 3). Fredborg was just the third man to win multiple medals in the event; he would become the only one to earn a third, in 1976. Daniel Clark's silver medal was Australia's first medal in the event since 1952. Jürgen Schütze's bronze was the first track time trial medal for East Germany as a separate nation.

Background

This was the 11th appearance of the event, which had previously been held in 1896 and every Games since 1928. It would be held every Games until being dropped from the programme after 2004. All three of the medalists from 1968 returned (gold medalist Pierre Trentin of France, silver medalist Niels Fredborg of Denmark, and [[bronze medalist Janusz Kierzkowski of Poland), along with seventh-place finisher Jocelyn Lovell of Canada. Fredborg had also won the 1967, 1968, and 1970 world championships; he was the favorite to win the Olympic competition this time. The 1971 world champion, Eduard Rapp of the Soviet Union, was also competing.

The Bahamas and Iran each made their debut in the men's track time trial. France and Great Britain each made their 11th appearance, having competed at every appearance of the event.

Competition format

The event was a time trial on the track, with each cyclist competing separately to attempt to achieve the fastest time. Each cyclist raced one kilometre from a standing start.

Records

The following were the world and Olympic records prior to the competition.

No new world or Olympic records were set during the competition.

Schedule

All times are Central European Time (UTC+1)

Results

References

External links
 Official Report

T
Cycling at the Summer Olympics – Men's track time trial
Track cycling at the 1972 Summer Olympics